Diddy may refer to:
Sean Combs (born 1969), American rap mogul also known as Puff Daddy, P. Diddy, Diddy, Puff, Puffy, and Sean John
"Diddy" (song), a 2001 song by P. Diddy
David Hamilton (broadcaster) (born 1938), British broadcaster
Diddy Kong, a fictional Nintendo character
Diddy (DJ) (born 1966), 1990s dance act responsible for the hit single "Give Me Love"
Diddy Men, the fictitious dwarves created and popularised by British comedian Ken Dodd
Diddy Dick and Dom, a comedy duo portrayed by Richard McCourt and Dominic Wood
Diddy Movies, a CBBC show running from 2012 to 2014
Diddy TV, a sequel to Diddy Movies which has aired since 2016

See also
"Diddy Wah Diddy", a 1956 song written by Willie Dixon and Bo Diddley
Didi (disambiguation)
Ditty (disambiguation)